is a passenger railway station located in the city of Matsuyama, Ehime Prefecture, Japan. It is operated by the private transportation company Iyotetsu.

Lines

Layout
The station consists of one side platform serving a single bi-directional track. The station is unattended.  During most of the day, trains arrive every fifteen minutes.Used rails manufactured by the Carnegie Company of the United States for the Hankaku Railway in 1896 are used for the pillars of the platform shed

History
The station was opened on April 15, 1953. A new station building was completed in 2014.

Surrounding area
Matsuyama City General Community Centerer

See also
 List of railway stations in Japan

References

External links

Iyotetsu Gunchū Line
Railway stations in Ehime Prefecture
Railway stations in Japan opened in 1953
Railway stations in Matsuyama, Ehime